Issus, a river in Cilicia, Asia Minor, where Alexander the Great defeated Darius in 333 BC.

Cilicia
Rivers of Turkey